Lincoln Park  is a  urban park in downtown Portland, Maine. Created in 1866 following the 1866 Great Fire which burned down most of the buildings of Portland, it was named in honor of former President Abraham Lincoln. It is bounded by Congress, Pearl, Federal and Market streets. The park was added to the National Register of Historic Places in 1989.

Description
Lincoln Park is located near the geographic center of peninsular Portland, at the southern corner of Congress and Franklin Streets.  It is shaped roughly like a parallelogram, and is a relatively flat open grassy area, dotted with trees.  A network of walking paths radiate away from a fountain located near the center of the park, and there are internal park walkways adjacent to Congress and Federal Streets.  (The fountain was originally at the park's center, but its eastern boundary was reduced in order to widen Franklin Street, a major city artery.)  The park is encircled by iron fencing.  Entrances, each of which is flanked by dressed granite posts, are located at the four corners, and at the center of the Federal Street side.  A gate providing access for maintenance vehicles is located at the Congress/Federal corner.

History
The park, the city's first public park, was acquired in the aftermath of Portland devastating 1866 fire, in which more than 1,800 building were destroyed, devastating the city's downtown and port areas.  The land was purchased for just over $81,000 at 75 cents a square foot.  Its layout and design are credited to city engineer Charles R. Goodell, although a number of his design details were not implemented.  In 1909, the lot immediately west of the park (across Pearl Street) was taken and landscaped as an extension to the park.  It is now the location of Portland central fire station.

Occupy Maine
In 2011, the Occupy Maine encampment, part of the larger "Occupy" protests, began "occupying" in Lincoln Park as part of an arrangement with the city authorities. At 4am on October 25, a chemical bomb was thrown into the park at the encampment. On December 8, Portland City Council voted 8-1 in favor of denying Occupy Maine a permit to stay in the park.

See also
National Register of Historic Places listings in Portland, Maine

References

External links

1866 establishments in Maine
Urban public parks
Parks in Portland, Maine
Parks on the National Register of Historic Places in Maine
National Register of Historic Places in Portland, Maine
Historic districts on the National Register of Historic Places in Maine